Respect: Original Motion Picture Soundtrack is the soundtrack album to the 2021 American film Respect, released coinciding with the film's theatrical release on August 13, 2021, by Epic Records and MGM Records. Based on the life of American singer Aretha Franklin, the film directed by Liesl Tommy, featured singer-actor Jennifer Hudson portraying Franklin. Hudson performed most of the tracks in the album. The soundtrack featured covers of Franklin's songs, and an original song "Here I Am (Singing My Way Home)" witten by Hudson, Carole King, and Jamie Hartman and produced by will.i.am and Johnny Goldstein. It was released as a single on June 18, 2021, and had peaked at number 21 on the Billboard Adult R&B Songs chart. The soundtrack debuted at number 6 on Billboard Top Soundtracks chart. Respect: Original Motion Picture Score, the score album composed by Kris Bowers released on the same date as the film's soundtrack, by Milan Records.

Background 
The film's executive music producer, Stephen Bray, said in an interview to Billboard, stating that "From the beginning, the agreement was, ‘Let’s time travel to the degree we can in terms of recreating these iconic sessions for songs like ‘I Never Loved a Man” and “Respect’ and ‘Ain’t No Way.’ Let’s do the best we can at making it look and sound exactly like it may have back in 1967 or ’68.’ Super music nerd that I am, I had the time of my life. I would have done it for free. I’m lucky I got hired to do it. It’s the most fun I’ve ever had working." He referred to several documentaries and television shows based on Franklin's life for his research.

To get into the sounds, representing the 1960s, Bray collected vintage Neumann U-47 and U-48 microphones, as well as specific drum kits. He joined with executive music producer Jason Michael Webb, to supervise the soundtrack, and brought Charles Chalmers, a recurrent saxophonist for Franklin, to play for the cover versions of the soundtrack. While the singing was done live on sets, the instrumentation process happened remotely due to the COVID-19 pandemic, where all musicians had to record in their own homes. Bray added "Liesl [Tommy] made it a point to bring in people who can really sing live. That helped us a lot in post (production). We didn’t have to worry about doing all that vocal subbing you see in a lot of these kinds of movies."

Hudson apart from singing, also played piano for this film, who attributed on Franklin's connection and influence she had in her life. Speaking to Los Angeles Times, Tommy said "Aretha was capable of so much power when she sings and so much delicacy and nuance. I wanted the way that we feel listening to her music to be the way that we felt watching the film. Another thing that guided me is that she has so much emotion in her singing. I felt that the film should be emotional too because that’s who she was. And even though she was very protective of her private life, her private life is all over her music."

Reception 
BroadwayWorld's Courtney Savoia wrote "This soundtrack wonderfully succeeds at bringing the music of Aretha Franklin to new generations through the incredibly talented, Jennifer Hudson. It's a beautiful way to bridge the music of past and present and celebrate strong women relating to and inspiring others." Writing for AllMusic, Andy Kellman said "Lesser singers would likely attempt imitation and undoubtedly fall short. Hudson is among the few who could pull it off. Instead, the powerhouse seems to glean her own past as much as that of her subject, and though she nails some of the queen's mannerisms and inflections—especially when the material calls for elation and assertion  her voice remains singular. Performances of three songs from the outstanding live gospel album Amazing Grace (1972) don't have the same sense of urgency, and the crowd noise on "Respect" is jarringly disconnected. More often, however, these renderings glow and do right by the queen. Hudson, whose recordings since JHUD (2014) have been scattered in terms of purpose, style, and quality, hasn't sounded this inspired in some time." The Musical Hype gave 4 out of 5 to the soundtrack, saying "Covering an untouchable icon is a tall task, even for a singer as gifted as Jennifer Hudson.  All in all, she does an awesome job.  On Respect, she does her job – capturing the essence of the icon. Is Respect perfect? By no means, nor would anybody expect it to be. There was and always will be only ONE Queen of Soul. That said, I give mad props to Hudson, who gives her all and very best song after song."

Track listing

Charts

Accolades

References 

2021 soundtrack albums